is a Japanese professional sumo wrestler from Nishio, Aichi Prefecture. He made his professional debut in March 2013, joining Tomozuna stable, and reached the jūryō division in September 2019. His highest rank has been jūryō 2. He has one sandanme division championship or yūshō.

Early life
Asaki Honda was born in Nishio, a city located in Aichi Prefecture. He started practicing judo since his childhood being taught by his father. In his third year at Aichisangyodaigaku Mikawakoto High School he would rank second in the 100 kg weight division of the Aichi Prefectural tournament gaining him the nickname "Terminator of Mikawa". He would never compete in sumo before his debut, but was convinced by his cousin who had a connection with a Miyagino stable junior wrestler. After being introduced to Asakayama oyakata, the former ōzeki Kaiō and a member of the same ichimon, Honda would choose to forego university in favor of joining Tomozuna stable.

Career

Honda would make his debut in March 2013 alongside future sekitori Endō, Daishōhō, Takagenji, and Takanofuji. Honda wrestled in maezumo with his surname, but switched to the shikona Kaishō following his jonokuchi debut. In January 2014 he would follow Asakayama oyakata who established a stable of the same name, being one of its founding disciples. After transferring, Kaishō would regularly train at Azumazeki stable, receiving peronalized training from former komusubi Takamisakari. Kaishō had a strong start, and breezed through the first two divisions with relative ease. He switched his shikona to Kaiseiō for the July 2014 tournament.  After three straight kachi-koshi, or winning records in sandanme, Kaiseiō earned promotion to the makushita division for the May 2015 tournament.
  
Kaiseiō had a strong showing in his first two tournaments in makushita. He reached the upper-half of the division by his third tournament. However for the May 2016 tournament, Kaiseiō had a right ankle surgery and had to miss out on every match. This result demoted him back to the sandanme division. Even though he wasn't completely healed, he still participated and finished with a 5-2 in the following July tournament. Kaiseiō became a makushita mainstay for around three years, with the exception of a couple tournaments in sandanme. In January 2018, Kaiseiō reverted back to his old shikona of Kaishō and immediately won all seven matches in sandanme. He was placed in a playoff against Tochikodai, which he won as well. He spent the following tournaments in upper level makushita, and after a win against jūryō-ranked wrestler Arawashi, Kaishō earned promotion to the jūryō division for the September 2019 tournament following a 4-3 record at makushita 4. He was selected ahead of Wakamotoharu who had scored 5-2 at makushita 5, despite losing to Wakamotoharu during the tournament, a fact that his own stablemaster thought might count against him. 
  
Kaisho was the first wrestler from Asakayama stable to earn sekitori status. In his jūryō debut, Kaishō lost his first three matches but, would bounce back and win 8 out of the 10 following matches. He lost his final three matches to finish with a decent 8-7 record. This promoted him to jūryō 11 for the November 2019, tournament. Kaishō struggled in the tournament and finished with a 5-10 record. This regulated him back to the makushita division, where he would remain for all of 2020. He would return to jūryō in July 2021 and posted a strong 11-4 record, which would include a win over Abi, ending the latter's 21-match winning streak since his return from suspension. He would follow this up with a 8-7 record in September. This would see him promoted up to jūryō 2 for the November tournament. A good tournament here would have seen him likely promoted to the top makuuchi division for the new year but, he would falter going 5-10 by the finish.

He was forced to withdraw from the July 2022 tournament on Day 12, with his score at 5-6, due to a COVID-19 outbreak at his stable.

Fighting style
Kaishō is a yotsu-sumo wrestler, preferring grappling techniques to pushing and thrusting. His most common winning kimarite is a straightforward yori-kiri, or force out, and he uses a hidari-yotsu grip on the mawashi or belt, with his right hand outside and left hand inside his opponent's arms.

Career record

See also
Glossary of sumo terms
List of active sumo wrestlers

References

External links
 

1995 births
Living people
Japanese sumo wrestlers
Sumo people from Aichi Prefecture